Coyah is a prefecture located in the Kindia Region of Guinea. The capital is Coyah. The prefecture covers an area of 1,375 km.² and has a population of 263,861.

Sub-prefectures
The prefecture is divided administratively into 4 sub-prefectures:
 Coyah-Centre
 Kouriah
 Manéah
 Wonkifong

Prefectures of Guinea
Kindia Region